The arrondissement of Montbéliard is an arrondissement of France in the Doubs department in the Bourgogne-Franche-Comté region. It has 168 communes.

Composition

The communes of the arrondissement of Montbéliard, and their INSEE codes, are:
 
 Abbévillers (25004)
 Accolans (25005)
 Aibre (25008)
 Allenjoie (25011)
 Allondans (25013)
 Anteuil (25018)
 Appenans (25019)
 Arbouans (25020)
 Arcey (25022)
 Audincourt (25031)
 Autechaux-Roide (25033)
 Badevel (25040)
 Bart (25043)
 Battenans-Varin (25046)
 Bavans (25048)
 Belfays (25049)
 Belleherbe (25051)
 Belvoir (25053)
 Berche (25054)
 Bethoncourt (25057)
 Beutal (25059)
 Bief (25061)
 Blamont (25063)
 Blussangeaux (25066)
 Blussans (25067)
 Bondeval (25071)
 Bourguignon (25082)
 Bournois (25083)
 Branne (25087)
 Les Bréseux (25091)
 Bretigney (25093)
 Brognard (25097)
 Burnevillers (25102)
 Cernay-l'Église (25108)
 Chamesol (25114)
 Charmauvillers (25124)
 Charmoille (25125)
 Charquemont (25127)
 Chazot (25145)
 Colombier-Fontaine (25159)
 Courcelles-lès-Montbéliard (25170)
 Cour-Saint-Maurice (25173)
 Courtefontaine (25174)
 Crosey-le-Grand (25177)
 Crosey-le-Petit (25178)
 Dambelin (25187)
 Dambenois (25188)
 Dampierre-les-Bois (25190)
 Dampierre-sur-le-Doubs (25191)
 Dampjoux (25192)
 Damprichard (25193)
 Dannemarie (25194)
 Dasle (25196)
 Désandans (25198)
 Dung (25207)
 Échenans (25210)
 Les Écorces (25213)
 Écot (25214)
 Écurcey (25216)
 Étouvans (25224)
 Étrappe (25226)
 Étupes (25228)
 Exincourt (25230)
 Faimbe (25232)
 Ferrières-le-Lac (25234)
 Fesches-le-Châtel (25237)
 Fessevillers (25238)
 Feule (25239)
 Fleurey (25244)
 Fontaine-lès-Clerval (25246)
 Fournet-Blancheroche (25255)
 Frambouhans (25256)
 Froidevaux (25261)
 Gémonval (25264)
 Geney (25266)
 Glay (25274)
 Glère (25275)
 Goumois (25280)
 Goux-lès-Dambelin (25281)
 Grand-Charmont (25284)
 La Grange (25290)
 Hérimoncourt (25304)
 L'Hôpital-Saint-Lieffroy (25306)
 Hyémondans (25311)
 Indevillers (25314)
 L'Isle-sur-le-Doubs (25315)
 Issans (25316)
 Laire (25322)
 Lanthenans (25327)
 Liebvillers (25335)
 Longevelle-sur-Doubs (25345)
 Lougres (25350)
 Maîche (25356)
 Mancenans (25365)
 Mancenans-Lizerne (25366)
 Mandeure (25367)
 Marvelise (25369)
 Mathay (25370)
 Médière (25372)
 Meslières (25378)
 Montancy (25386)
 Montandon (25387)
 Montbéliard (25388)
 Mont-de-Vougney (25392)
 Montécheroux (25393)
 Montenois (25394)
 Montjoie-le-Château (25402)
 Neuchâtel-Urtière (25422)
 Noirefontaine (25426)
 Nommay (25428)
 Onans (25431)
 Orgeans-Blanchefontaine (25433)
 Orve (25436)
 Pays-de-Clerval (25156)
 Péseux (25449)
 Pierrefontaine-lès-Blamont (25452)
 Les Plains-et-Grands-Essarts (25458)
 Pompierre-sur-Doubs (25461)
 Pont-de-Roide-Vermondans (25463)
 Présentevillers (25469)
 La Prétière (25470)
 Provenchère (25471)
 Rahon (25476)
 Randevillers (25478)
 Rang (25479)
 Raynans (25481)
 Rémondans-Vaivre (25485)
 Roche-lès-Clerval (25496)
 Roches-lès-Blamont (25497)
 Rosières-sur-Barbèche (25503)
 Sainte-Marie (25523)
 Sainte-Suzanne (25526)
 Saint-Georges-Armont (25516)
 Saint-Hippolyte (25519)
 Saint-Julien-lès-Montbéliard (25521)
 Saint-Maurice-Colombier (25524)
 Sancey (25529)
 Seloncourt (25539)
 Semondans (25540)
 Sochaux (25547)
 Solemont (25548)
 Soulce-Cernay (25551)
 Sourans (25552)
 Soye (25553)
 Surmont (25554)
 Taillecourt (25555)
 Les Terres-de-Chaux (25138)
 Thiébouhans (25559)
 Thulay (25562)
 Trévillers (25571)
 Urtière (25573)
 Valentigney (25580)
 Valonne (25583)
 Valoreille (25584)
 Vandoncourt (25586)
 Vaucluse (25588)
 Vauclusotte (25589)
 Vaufrey (25591)
 Vellerot-lès-Belvoir (25595)
 Vellevans (25597)
 Vernois-lès-Belvoir (25607)
 Le Vernoy (25608)
 Vieux-Charmont (25614)
 Villars-lès-Blamont (25615)
 Villars-sous-Dampjoux (25617)
 Villars-sous-Écot (25618)
 Voujeaucourt (25632)
 Vyt-lès-Belvoir (25635)

History

The arrondissement of Saint-Hippolyte was created in 1800. The subprefecture was moved to Montbéliard in 1816. In 2009 the canton of Le Russey that previously belonged to the arrondissement of Montbéliard was added to the arrondissement of Pontarlier.

As a result of the reorganisation of the cantons of France which came into effect in 2015, the borders of the cantons are no longer related to the borders of the arrondissements. The cantons of the arrondissement of Montbéliard were, as of January 2015:

 Audincourt
 Clerval
 Étupes
 Hérimoncourt
 L'Isle-sur-le-Doubs
 Maîche
 Montbéliard-Est
 Montbéliard-Ouest
 Pont-de-Roide
 Saint-Hippolyte
 Sochaux-Grand-Charmont
 Valentigney

Sub-prefects 
 Robert Miguet 1974-1978 : sub-prefect of Montbéliard

References

Montbeliard